Temyanikovo is a rural locality (a village) in Ustyuzhenskoye Rural Settlement, Ustyuzhensky District, Vologda Oblast, Russia. The population was 21 as of 2002.

Geography 
Lyubotovo is the nearest rural locality.

References 

Rural localities in Ustyuzhensky District